Typha × provincialis is a plant of hybrid origin, endemic to southern France. Type collection was obtained from near St. Tropez in Provence. It apparently originated as a cross between  the two very widespread species T. domingensis and T. latifolia.  Typha × provincialis grows in freshwater marshes.

References

provincialis
Freshwater plants
Plant nothospecies
Endemic flora of France
Plants described in 1910